Lucas Hans Göran Nordqvist (born 30 June 1992), better known by his stage name Lucas Nord, is a Swedish electronic musician, DJ, remixer and record producer. Is known for the single "Run on Love", features vocals by Swedish singer Tove Lo, taken from 2013 debut album Islands, reached number one on Billboard's Dance Club Songs chart the week ending 2 January 2016, giving Nord his first U.S. chart topper and Lo her third consecutive number one on this chart.

Discography

Albums
 Islands (2013)

Extended plays
 After You (2015)
 Company (2016)
 Ego (2018)
 Boy Restless (2020)

Remixes
 Brother Leo — "Hallelujah" (Lucas Nord Remix) (2018)

References

External links

1992 births
Electro house musicians
Living people
Musicians from Stockholm
Remixers
Swedish DJs
Swedish house musicians
Swedish record producers
English-language singers from Sweden
Electronic dance music DJs
21st-century Swedish singers
21st-century Swedish male singers